Police Ariyaruthe is a 1973 Indian Malayalam-language film, directed and produced by M. S. Senthil Kumar. The film stars Madhu, K. P. Ummer, Rani Chandra and Sudheer. The film's score was composed by V. Dakshinamoorthy.

Cast

Madhu
K. P. Ummer
Rani Chandra
Sudheer
Ushanandini
Sukumari
O. Ramdas
Mancheri Chandran
Abbas (Old)
N. Govindankutty
Philomina

Soundtrack
The music was composed by V. Dakshinamoorthy with lyrics by Mankombu Gopalakrishnan.

References

External links
 

1973 films
1970s Malayalam-language films